Route 149 is a  north–south highway on Cape Cod in southeastern Massachusetts. The route, located in Barnstable County, begins at an intersection with Route 28 in Marstons Mills, serving as the main road through the small community. The route crosses US 6 (the Mid-Cape Highway) before reaching a junction with Route 6A in West Barnstable. The route was a former designation of Route 49.

Route description 
Route 149 begins at an intersection with Route 28 (Falmouth Road) in the town of Barnstable, within the community of Marstons Mills. Passing Mill Pond, Route 149 proceeds northeast through Marstons Mills, as the two-lane Contuit Road. In Marstons Mills, the route junctions with River Road and Main Street, a double fork in the center of the community. Route 149 passes multiple homes, leaving Marstons Mills as it passes Hamblin Pond. After Old Famouth Road, the highway winds north along the east side of the pond, and passes Cape Cod Airport.

Route 149 continues northeast along the western edge of Olde Barnstable Fairgrounds Golf Course, becoming Prospect Street after crossing through a rotary. The highway continues northeast through the West Barnstable Conservation Area. Route 149 runs northeast and into a partial cloverleaf interchange with US 6 (Mid-Cape Highway exit 65). Now in West Barnstable, Route 149 becomes Meetinghouse Way and reaches a junction with Route 6A (Main Street) in downtown West Barnstable, south of Sandy Neck Beach Park.

Major intersections

References

External links

149
Transportation in Barnstable County, Massachusetts